Newmark's shrew (Crocidura newmarki) is a species of mammal in the family Soricidae. It is endemic to Tanzania.

It is restricted to Mt. Meru, where it is one of two endemic mammals, alongside Verhagen's brush-furred rat (Lophuromys verhageni). It inhabits montane forest and heath above the treeline. It has a head to rump length of 65–85 mm, a tail of 45–60 mm and a weight of 6–11 g. The hairs are gray with brown tips. It is named in honor of American conservation biologist William T. Newmark, who conducted significant research into the biodiversity of Tanzania.

It is considered near threatened as its mountain habitats may be threatened in the future by climate change, and possibly disturbance from tourism.

References 
Crocidura
Endemic fauna of Tanzania
Mammals of Tanzania
Mammals described in 2015